Regulator of G-protein signaling 7 is a protein that in humans is encoded by the RGS7 gene.

RGS7 is highly enriched in the brain where it acts as a universal inhibitor of Gi/o-coupled GPCR. RGS7 is a GTPase-activating protein (GAP). It accelerates the GTP hydrolysis on G proteins determining their fast inactivation and acting as intracellular antagonists of GPCR signaling.

Interactions 

RGS7 has been shown to interact with:
 GNB5, 
 GPR158, 
 GPR179, 
 PKD1,  and
 SNAPAP.

References

Further reading